Shakikhanov's house or Shakikhanov's palace, is a monument of Azerbaijani architecture, located in the Sheki preserve area.

Style 
The structure is a mixture between the standard vernacular of homes in the area and a palace. A two-storied building with a long, rectangular shape is similar to palace buildings, while the interior decorative elements are more in the style of the interior of Sheki houses.

Each floor consists of three rooms and two small corridors. The rooms on the first floor have winter halls, where "bukharis" (fireplaces) are placed. The second floor, similar to the first floor, is designed for guests.

In the second floor interior, the main flooring is a decorative vine. Rectangular boards cover the walls. Wall painting subjects include Persian poet Nizami's heroes, "Seven Beauties", "Leyli and Majnun" poems and covered with a very unusual stalactite. Two types of cabinets are used. The ceiling and the cavities of the three walls pass through the shelves. Small boards are on the shelves. The sockets are decorated with flowers, animal and bird pictures in the vases. The rest of the hall, except the outer wall, is designed with a drawing ornamented "network".

Gallery

Architecture

Wall paintings

References

See also 
 Shaki Khanate
 Palace of Shaki Khans
 Shaki

Architecture in Azerbaijan
Islamic architecture
Shaki, Azerbaijan
18th-century architecture
Palaces in Azerbaijan
Shaki Khanate
Museums in Shaki